Bramcote College is a co-educational secondary school located in Bramcote, Nottinghamshire, England. It is a member of The White Hills Park Federation Trust.

History
This was the first school to be built on the Bramcote Hills Site. In 1948 it opened as a Secondary Modern boys school named Bramcote Hills Boys School It later became a comprehensive school titled The Park Comprehensive.

Bramcote Park Comprehensive School became a Business and Enterprise school in 2004. After receiving business status, it re-branded its image by announced a new logo and identity, consisting of red, white and blue.

In 2007 the school became part of a three-piece federation, named The White Hills Park Federation Trust under one executive headteacher. The School was federated with neighbouring Bramcote Hills Sport & Community College and nearby Alderman White School. After the complete closure of Bramcote Hills School in 2011, the school adopted their status as a specialist Sports College.

On 1 October 2012 the school converted to academy status, and rebranded from Bramcote Park Sports, Business & Enterprise School to 'The Bramcote School'.  In the summer of 2017, the school moved from its old site into buildings shared with Bramcote College Sixth Form, and began operating and branding under the name 'Bramcote College'.

On the 16th September 2021, a fire broke out within the old school building. Investigations into the cause of the fire are currently on-going.

Campus
It is located to the south of Bramcote Woods, and to the east of Bramcote Park recreational and open grounds. It is part of a larger campus of schools build around the 1950s, which include Foxwood Special School, and the former Bramcote Hills Sport & Community College now a sixth form centre and part of Alderman White School.

Access to the school is from the eastbound A52 to Nottingham and shares a drive with Bramcote Leisure Centre and Foxwood School.  There is also a restricted vehicular and pedestrian access to the site of the former Bramcote Hills Sport & Community College following the creation of the federation, to enable staff and student movements between the schools.

References

External links
 Bramcote College
 White Hills Park Federation

Secondary schools in Nottinghamshire
Academies in Nottinghamshire